Mandelbach is a river of Rhineland-Palatinate, Germany.

The Mandelbach springs south of Lichtenborn. It is a right tributary of the Prüm in Manderscheid.

See also
List of rivers of Rhineland-Palatinate

References

Rivers of Rhineland-Palatinate
Rivers of Germany